This is a list of Scottish football transfers featuring at least one 2012–13 Scottish Premier League club or one 2012–13 Scottish First Division club which were completed after the end of the 2011–12 season and before the end of the 2012 summer transfer window.

May 2012 – August 2012

See also
 List of Scottish football transfers winter 2011–12
 List of Scottish football transfers winter 2012–13

References

Transfers
Scottish
2012 in Scottish sport
2012 summer